"Crawfish" is a song written by Fred Wise (lyrics) and Ben Weisman (music) and recorded as a duet by the jazz singer Kitty White and Elvis Presley.

It was the opening song for Presley's 1958 film King Creole.

British musician and Clash frontman Joe Strummer described "Crawfish" on his radio-show as one of his favourite Elvis Presley songs. The song and his recommendation were included on the soundtrack to the 2007 documentary Joe Strummer: The Future Is Unwritten.

Recording
Bilbrew and Presley recorded the song on January 15, 1958, during the soundtrack recording session for the Paramount movie, King Creole at Radio Recorders, West Hollywood, California. The producer was Walter Scharf, the sound engineer Thone Nogar. At least eight takes have been recorded; the master is take seven.

In 1978, Jean Bilbrew released an alternate master mix (with overdubs recorded in 1978) including the full length intro sung by herself. This version runs 4 minutes and 10 seconds.

Cover versions
The song has been covered a number of times, perhaps the most well-known is by Johnny Thunders and Patti Palladin released in 1985 and included on their Copy Cats covers album in 1988.

References

1958 songs
Crayfish
Crustaceans in culture
Elvis Presley songs
Songs with lyrics by Fred Wise (songwriter)
Songs with music by Ben Weisman